The genus Mitrephora, of family Annonaceae, comprises around 40 species of trees and shrubs found in tropical Asia and northern Australasia. The area of distribution extends from China in the North (Hainan, Yunnan) down to Queensland, Australia in the South. The genus is widely found in southern India (Karnataka, Kerala and Tamil Nadu) and Southeast Asia. It reaches a maximum of diversity in Borneo and the Philippines.

Description
Mitrephora are a genus of trees that are often tall.  They have leathery leaves. They have 3 rounded sepals. Their flowers have 6 petals arranged in two whorls. The edges of the petals in each whorl touch one another. The exterior petals are oval with somewhat conspicuous venation.  The interior petals have a basal claw with a vaulted blade. 
Their flowers have numerous oblong to wedge-shapted stamen with dorsally positioned bi-lobed anthers. Their flowers have hairless carpels with oblong ovaries.  Within the ovaries the numerous ovules are positioned axially in two rows. Its elongated styles are grooved on the inside.

Species
Species in the Genus include:

Mitrephora alba Ridl.
Mitrephora aversa
Mitrephora bousigoniana
Mitrephora calcarea
Mitrephora caudata
Mitrephora celebica
Mitrephora clemensiorum
Mitrephora collinsae
Mitrephora ellipanthoides
Mitrephora ferruginea
Mitrephora fragrans
Mitrephora glabra
Mitrephora glandulifera
Mitrephora grandiflora
Mitrephora heyneana
Mitrephora keithii
Mitrephora korthalsiana
Mitrephora lanotan
Mitrephora macclurei
Mitrephora macrocarpa
Mitrephora maingayi
Mitrephora multifolia
Mitrephora obtusa
Mitrephora pallens Jovet-Ast
Mitrephora petelotii
Mitrephora pictiflora
Mitrephora pisocarpa
Mitrephora polypyrena
Mitrephora reflexa
Mitrephora reticulata
Mitrephora rugosa
Mitrephora samarensis
Mitrephora simeuluensis
Mitrephora sirikitiae
Mitrephora sorsogonensis
Mitrephora teysmannii
Mitrephora tomentosa (synonym M. thorelii)
Mitrephora trimera
Mitrephora vandaeflora
Mitrephora versteegii
Mitrephora viridifolia
Mitrephora vittata
Mitrephora vulpina
Mitrephora wangii
Mitrephora weberi
Mitrephora williamsii
Mitrephora winitii
Mitrephora woodii
Mitrephora zippeliana

References

 
Annonaceae genera
Taxa named by Thomas Thomson (botanist)
Taxa named by Joseph Dalton Hooker
Taxa named by Carl Ludwig Blume
Plants described in 1855